Carlos Báez (born 22 May 1948) is a Puerto Rican middle-distance runner. He competed in the men's 800 metres at the 1968 Summer Olympics.

References

1948 births
Living people
Athletes (track and field) at the 1968 Summer Olympics
People from Villalba, Puerto Rico
Puerto Rican male middle-distance runners
Olympic track and field athletes of Puerto Rico
Athletes (track and field) at the 1975 Pan American Games
Pan American Games competitors for Puerto Rico